The 1994 Brisbane Rugby League season was the 74th season of semi-professional top level rugby league in Brisbane, Queensland, Australia. The season was the final campaign for the competition as an official top-tier rugby league competition.

Teams 

Source:

Final 
Redcliffe 24 (R. McGrady, G. Adamason, B. Pike, A. Schick tries; W. Miller 4 goals) defeated Western Suburbs 18 (S. Smith, S. Vivian, M. Maguire tries; M. Maguire 3 goals) at Lang Park.

References 

Rugby league in Brisbane
1994 in Australian rugby league